Whitley Bay High School is a coeducational upper school and sixth form located in Whitley Bay, North Tyneside, England.

Location
It is situated next to Monkseaton Drive (A1148), towards the north of Monkseaton, and is less than a mile from Monkseaton Metro station. It is in the Ward Monkseaton North, Monkseaton.

Intake
The school has 1700 students, with around 500 in sixth form.  In 2006, the school was awarded Specialist College Status in Science & Humanities

Most students live in the surrounding area of Whitley Bay, Tynemouth and Monkseaton. The rest are from other parts of Tyne and Wear. The majority of students join the school from one of four middle schools: Valley Gardens Middle School, Wellfield Middle School, Monkseaton Middle School, and Marden Bridge Middle School. Many students remain at the school from year 9 to year 13.

History

Grammar school
Formerly housed in what is now Marden Bridge Middle School, the school was originally built as a grammar school in 1963, and was known as Whitley Bay and Monkseaton Grammar School. The buildings were officially opened on 7 December 1963, by Edward Boyle, Baron Boyle of Handsworth. The original buildings on site were A Block, B Block and C Block. and in 1973, it became a high school.

New Buildings and Renovation
in 2003, another main block, called D block, was added to the school, featuring a school library, music facilities, a drama hall, and new science labs.

In 2006, major renovation took place for the 6th form facilities. The small common room was emptied out, and extended into a new 2-storey block connecting blocks A and B referred to as the ACL Block. This new block provides 6th form students with a 24 unit ICT facility, as well as a new, larger 6th form common room with a cafeteria. The ground floor of this block consists of specialised IT rooms with computers, projectors, interactive white boards and comfortable chairs.

In mid-2006, there was a major renovation of C-Block and the science laboratories on its first floor was completed. The new building work included two observation classrooms (one a laboratory and the other a normal classroom), with one way mirrors allowing observation of classes without disruption to learning from a small central room.

in 2013, C-Block saw an extension to its ground floor; a new science wing was built with science labs being styled more like classrooms for use by other subjects.

Redevelopment 
As part of the first wave of a Department for Education school rebuilding project which was set up for schools in major need of redevelopment, the school is currently undergoing a major redevelopment, with plans for the majority of the main buildings to be demolished upon the completion of a new grounds. The new grounds will have heat pumps and other features to help the school be carbon neutral. Work on the new building began in May 2022 and is planned to conclude in September 2023, in time for the new academic year. Demolition of the old school will then continue until July 2024 and will involve the destruction of all buildings built before 2000, incorporating modern sections into the new school

Buildings
It has four main buildings, with several other outlying blocks around them. They are:

 A-Block: English, Modern Foreign Languages (French and German), Science (predominantly Chemistry), the school gym, canteen, main hall and various offices.
 B-Block: Mathematics, Geography, Philosophy and Ethics, ICT and an additional sports hall (known as B-Block Hall).
 C-Block: Childcare, Design and Technology, Media Studies, Food Technology, Healthcare, Science (predominantly Biology), learning support and Textiles.
 D-Block (built 2003): Art, Drama, Music, Science (predominantly Physics), the School Library, a music recording studio and a drama studio.
 E-Block (built 2008): Art and Textiles. (demolished to make way for the new build)
F-Block: Psychology.
 G-Block: Business Studies and Economics.
H-Block: History and a Reprographics office.
I-Block: Physical education block for written work.
S-Block: Media.

As well as this, there is a block which contains the Physical Education offices, changing rooms, and main sports hall — it was refurbished in 2003.

The school offers use of their facilities which are available to rent. Facilities to rent include their 3 multi-purpose outdoor courts, their school Gym, their IT rooms and general classrooms.

Student TV Station
The school has its own student television station, Bay TV, conceived in 2006, through a student-teacher partnership. All programmes are broadcast through its own website. The mainstay of the station's broadcasts are 'Jam Today,' a popular music show, and 'It's Baytime!' a news & current affairs programme.

Former pupils

 Rudolf Abel, aka Vilyam Genrikhovich Fisher – KGB spy, born in Benwell.
 Alan Campbell – MP for Tynemouth, taught History at the school from 1980–9, and married a former pupil.
 Frank Collins – SAS Soldier, first to enter the building in the Iranian Embassy Siege. Later ordained as a Church of England minister. Committed suicide in 1998 a year after the publication of his book 'Baptism of Fire'.
 Dan Ellis BEM, – Entrepreneur, Prime Ministers Points of Light Awardee, BAFTA Love of Film Award Winner.
 Graham Fenton – Footballer who formerly played for Aston Villa, Blackburn Rovers and Leicester City.
 Sam Fender – Musician and Brit Award Winner
 Prof Sir Lawrence Freedman CBE, Professor of War Studies since 1982 at King's College London, and one of the inquirers of The Iraq Inquiry
 John Thomas Young Gilroy – English artist and illustrator, best known for his advertising posters for Guinness, the Irish stout.
 Will Lenney, Successful YouTuber with over 4 Million Subscribers.
 Paul Noble – artist, creator of Nobson Newtown, an ongoing series of drawings of an imaginary surrealist city.
 Alex Oates – Award-winning playwright and screenwriter.
 Joyce Quin – Baroness Quin of Gateshead, former MP for Gateshead East, also former prisons minister and deputy agriculture minister.
 Peter Ramage – professional footballer
 Lucy Ratcliffe – model and Britain's Next Top Model, Cycle 1 winner.
 Andrea Rea, aka Huffty – presenter of The Word (TV series).
 Greg Rutherford, professional footballer
 Michael Shanks – British archaeologist who taught Latin, Greek and Ancient History 1983–1988.
 Steven Tupling – former Middlesbrough, Hartlepool United and Cardiff City player, formerly taught PE at the school.
 Roger Uttley – former English rugby union player. Taught PE in the 1970s.
 Dame Ethel Wormald, Labour councillor and Lord Mayor of Liverpool

References

External links
 Whitley Bay High School official website
 EduBase

Upper schools in the Metropolitan Borough of North Tyneside
Educational institutions established in 1935
Whitley Bay
1935 establishments in England
Foundation schools in the Metropolitan Borough of North Tyneside